

A Journey to Arzrum (full title: A Journey to Arzrum during the Campaign of 1829, «Путешествие в Арзрум во время похода 1829 года») is a work of travel literature by Alexander Pushkin.  It was originally written by Pushkin in 1829, partially published in 1830, reworked in 1835, and then fully published in Pushkin's journal Sovremennik in 1836.

The work recounts the poet's travels to the Caucasus, Armenia, and Arzrum (modern Erzurum) in eastern Turkey at the time of the Russo-Turkish War (1828–29). The Tsarist authorities never allowed Pushkin to travel abroad and he had only been permitted to travel as far as Tiflis (Tbilisi), capital of Georgia and Russian Transcaucasia. His unauthorized journey across the border into Turkey infuriated Tsar Nicholas I, who "threatened to confine Pushkin to his estate once again."

Pushkin's text challenged, though did not entirely reject, the Orientalist romanticism of his earlier Prisoner of the Caucasus.  As a result, it was not popularly received by contemporary readers who expected a romantic epic poem about the Caucasus.

A Journey to Arzrum was later adapted into a film during the Soviet era. Produced by Lenfilm and released on the 100th anniversary of Pushkin's passing in 1937, it was directed by Moisei Levin and starred Dmitri Zhuravlyov as Pushkin.

English translations
 Birgitta Ingemanson, 
 Ronald Wilks in 
 Nicholas Pasternak Slater in 
 Richard Pevear and Larissa Volokhonsky in 
 Derek Davis in

See also
 Armenian Oblast
 Russian conquest of the Caucasus

References

External links
  The text of A Journey to Arzrum at Russian Wikisource

Works by Aleksandr Pushkin
Books about Armenia
Books about Turkey
Asian travel books